Al Mahalla may refer to:

 Almahalla SC, a football club in Libya
 El Mahalla El Kubra, a city in Egypt